FIND® technology is a directed evolution technology that uses DNA recombination to improve properties of proteins. It eliminates unimportant and deleterious mutations while maintaining and combining beneficial mutations that would enhance protein function.

Procedures
For the relevant gene, a library of single stranded oligonucleotides is acquired and then mutated using random mutagenesis.  The newly mutated library is then subjected to exonuclease activity, creating both sense and anti-sense fragments. The areas of partially overlapping fragments are then combined and extended using a PCR-like method.  These double stranded mutants are then screened for the desired optimized function using a relevant assay.  The best mutants are chosen for further exonuclease activity. The process (exonuclease, PCR-like recombination, and mutant screening) is repeated, usually about 10-12 times, in order to achieve the best possible mutants with only beneficial mutations.

Example

CHIPS
CHIPS is a protein that inhibits immune cell activation normally associated with inflammation.  CHIPS has potential as an anti-inflammatory agent, but native CHIP has been associated with activation and interaction with antibodies.  FIND® technology was used to create a truncated, yet functional mutant of this protein with reduced antibody interaction.

Intellectual property
The company Alligator Bioscience has the intellectual rights to the FIND technology and uses it both for contract work optimizing proteins for the pharmaceutical industry and to develop their own protein drugs.

References

Evolutionary biology
Biotechnology